Shuluta (Shuluuta) is a rural locality (an ulus) in Zaigrayevsky District, Republic of Buryatia, Russia. The population was 186 as of 2010.

Geography 
Shuluta is located 36 km north of Zaigrayevo (the district's administrative centre) by road. Pervomayevka is the nearest rural locality.

References 

Rural localities in Zaigrayevsky District